Golden Globe Award for Best Actor can refer to:

Golden Globe Award for Best Actor – Miniseries or Television Film
Golden Globe Award for Best Actor – Motion Picture Drama
Golden Globe Award for Best Actor – Motion Picture Musical or Comedy
Golden Globe Award for Best Actor – Television Series Drama
Golden Globe Award for Best Actor – Television Series Musical or Comedy